The Battle of Levounion was the first decisive Byzantine victory of the Komnenian restoration. On April 29, 1091, an invading force of Pechenegs was crushed by the combined forces of the Byzantine Empire under Alexios I Komnenos and his Cuman allies.

Background
On August 26, 1071, a Byzantine army under Romanos IV Diogenes was defeated by the Seljuk Turks at Manzikert in eastern Asia Minor. The defeat caused the emperor to be deposed and replaced by the ineffectual Michael VII Doukas, who refused to honour the treaty that had been signed by Romanos. In response, the Turks began to move into Anatolia in 1073, meeting no opposition. Chaos reigned as the empire's resources were squandered in a series of disastrous civil wars. Thousands of Turkoman tribesmen crossed the unguarded frontier and moved into Anatolia. By 1080, an area of  had been lost by the empire. It is almost impossible to overestimate the significance of these events, as within less than a decade more than half of the manpower of the empire had been lost, along with much of its grain supply. Thus, the Battle of Manzikert resulted in the greatest blow to the Empire in its 700 years of history.

It is against this backdrop of defeat and disaster that Alexios Komnenos, a successful young general who had been fighting against the Turks since the age of fourteen, ascended the throne on Easter Sunday, April 4, 1081. According to John Julius Norwich, the significance of Alexios's rise to power was that "...for the first time in over half a century the empire was in capable hands." Alexios determined to restore the fortunes of the Byzantine Empire, whatever the cost. Around 1090 or 1091, Emir Chaka of Smyrna suggested an alliance with the Pechenegs in order to completely destroy the Byzantine Empire.

Pechenegs invade
In the spring of 1087, news reached the Byzantine court of a huge invasion from the north. The invaders were Pechenegs from the north-west Black Sea region; it was reported that they numbered 80,000 men in all. Taking advantage of the precarious situation of the Byzantines, the Pecheneg horde headed towards the Byzantine capital at Constantinople, plundering the northern Balkans as they went. The invasion posed a serious threat to Alexios's empire, yet due to years of civil war and neglect the Byzantine military was unable to provide the emperor with enough troops to repel the Pecheneg invaders. Alexios was forced to rely on his own ingenuity and diplomatic skill to save his empire from annihilation. He appealed to another Turk nomadic tribe, the Cumans, to join him in battle against the Pechenegs.

Battle
Won over by Alexios's offer of gold in return for aid against the Pechenegs, the Cumans hurried to join Alexios and his army. In the late spring of 1091, the Cuman forces arrived in Byzantine territory, and the combined army prepared to advance against the Pechenegs. On Monday, April 28, 1091, Alexios and his allies reached the Pecheneg camp at Levounion near the Hebros River.

The Pechenegs appear to have been caught by surprise. At any rate, the battle that took place on the next morning at Levounion was practically a massacre. The Pecheneg warriors had brought their women and children with them, and they were totally unprepared for the ferocity of the attack that was unleashed upon them. The Cumans and the Byzantines fell upon the enemy camp, slaughtering all in their path. The Pechenegs quickly collapsed, and the victorious allies butchered them so savagely that they were almost wiped out. The survivors were captured by the Byzantines and taken into imperial service.

Significance
Levounion was the single most decisive victory achieved by a Byzantine army for more than half a century. The battle marks a turning point in Byzantine history; the empire had reached the nadir of its fortunes in the last twenty years, and Levounion signalled to the world that now at last the empire was on the road to recovery. The Pechenegs had been utterly destroyed, and the empire's European possessions were now secure. Alexios had proved himself as the saviour of Byzantium in its hour of need, and a new spirit of hope began to arise in the war-weary Byzantines.

In the years ahead, Byzantium would go on to stage a remarkable recovery under Alexios and his descendants, the Komnenoi. Byzantine armies returned to Asia Minor, reconquering much of the lost territory there including the fertile coastal regions, along with many of the most important cities. With the restoration of firm central government, the empire became rich during the course of the next century, and Constantinople once more became the metropolis of the Christian world. Thus, the battle at Levounion in 1091 marked the beginning of a resurgence of Byzantine power and influence that would last for a hundred years, until the demise of the Komnenian dynasty at the close of the 12th century.

Bibliography

Sources
Norwich, John Julius (1997), A Short History of Byzantium, Viking, 
Haldon, John (2001), The Byzantine Wars, Tempus, 
Angold, Michael (1997), The Byzantine Empire, 1025–1204, A Political History, Longman, 
Memishoglu, Leon, Turks through History.

1091 in Europe
1090s in the Byzantine Empire
11th-century massacres
Levounion
Levounion
Levounion
Levounion
Massacres in the Byzantine Empire
Levounion
Battles involving the Pechenegs